An optical mount is a device used to join a normal camera and another optical instrument, such as a microscope or telescope. The optical mount is generally attached to the camera as a lens would on one end, and fastened to the other instrument in a similar fashion. Optical mounts are used extensively in scientific imaging applications in biology and astronomy.

Photography equipment
Microscopy
Astronomical instruments
Optomechanics